Paenungulata (from Latin paene "almost" + ungulātus "having hoofs") is a clade of "sub-ungulates", which groups three extant mammal orders: Proboscidea (including elephants), Sirenia (sea cows, including dugongs and manatees), and Hyracoidea (hyraxes). At least two more possible orders are known only as fossils, namely Embrithopoda and Desmostylia.

Molecular evidence indicates that Paenungulata (or at least its extant members) is part of the cohort Afrotheria, an ancient assemblage of mainly African mammals of great diversity. The other members of this cohort are the orders Afrosoricida (tenrecs and golden moles), Macroscelidea (elephant shrews) and Tubulidentata (aardvarks).

Of the five orders, hyraxes are the most basal, followed by embrithopods; the remaining orders (sirenians and elephants) are more closely related. These latter three are grouped as the Tethytheria, because it is believed that their common ancestors lived on the shores of the prehistoric Tethys Sea; however, recent myoglobin studies indicate that even Hyracoidea had an aquatic ancestor.

History 
In 1945, George Gaylord Simpson used traditional taxonomic techniques to group these spectacularly diverse mammals in the superorder he named Paenungulata ("almost ungulates"), but there were many loose threads in unravelling their genealogy. For example, hyraxes in his Paenungulata had some characteristics suggesting they might be connected to the Perissodactyla (odd-toed ungulates, such as horses and rhinos). Indeed, early taxonomists placed the Hyracoidea closest to the rhinoceroses because of their dentition.

When genetic techniques were developed for inspecting amino acid differences among haemoglobin sequences the most parsimonious cladograms depicted Simpson's Paenungulata as an authentic clade and as one of the first groups to diversify from the basal placental mammals (Eutheria). The amino acid sequences reject a connection between extant paenungulates and perissodactyls (odd-toed ungulates).

However, a 2014 cladistic analysis placed anthracobunids and desmostylians, two major extinct groups that have been considered to be non-African afrotheres, close to each other within Perissodactyla.

Phylogeny

Gallery

Extinct orders
Each of the extinct orders, the Embrithopoda and Desmostylia, was as unique in its members' ways of making a living as the three orders that survive. Embrithopods were rhinoceros-like herbivorous mammals with plantigrade feet, and desmostylians were hippopotamus-like amphibious animals. Their walking posture and diet have been the subject of speculation, but tooth wear indicates that desmostylians browsed on terrestrial plants and had a posture similar to other large hoofed mammals.

See also
 Altungulata
 Meridiungulata

Notes

References

Sources

Further reading

External links

 
Mammal taxonomy
Mammals of Africa
Extant Selandian first appearances
Mammal unranked clades